Tjarco Cuppens (born 20 May 1976) is a Dutch former professional racing cyclist, active between 2000 and 2014.

Major wins

1999
 1st Sprints classification, Tour de Namur
2000
 1st Stage 1 Rás Tailteann
 10th Vlaamse Pijl
2002
 1st Sprints classification, Tour of Japan
2007
 8th Overall Tour de Korea
2008
 8th Rund um Düren
2009
 1st Stage 3 Ras Mumhan
 1st Sprints classification, Flèche du Sud
2011
 7th Kernen Omloop Echt-Susteren
2012
 1st  Time trial, Singapore National Road Championships
2013
 1st  Road race, Singapore National Road Championships
 5th Melaka Governor's Cup

References

External links
 

1976 births
Living people
Dutch male cyclists
People from Hulsberg
Cyclists from Limburg (Netherlands)